The Sudbury Canadians were a women's soccer team based in Sudbury, Ontario, Canada. The team played its home games in Cambrian College. They played only 3 seasons in the W-League.  In its three seasons, the team relied predominantly on local talent. The team folded after the 2006 season but the other level programs continue.
  
Today, the Sudbury Canadians Soccer Club  operates competitive teams of all ages and participates in the Sudbury Regional Soccer League and the Ontario Soccer Association (OSA). The club is dedicated to the promotion of young girls soccer.

Staff

    General manager and President:  Frank Malvaso
    Head Coach: Emile Malvaso

Year-by-year
See also:  2004 season
See also:  2005 season
See also:  2006 season

References

External links
 Official website
  Sudbury Canadians in USL website, 2006
   Team roster with players stats in USL website, 2006.

External news story
    Articles archive of Sudbury Sports.com, May 2004 to August 2007.
   Sudbury Canadians head to the U.S in Sudbury Stars newspaper.
 Soccer Scholarships - Northern Ontario players in OSA news bulletin, March 12, 2008.
 Sudbury Canadians player heads to NCAA in Northern Life.ca, March 9, 2011.

Women's soccer clubs in Canada
Sports teams in Greater Sudbury
Soccer clubs in Ontario
Defunct USL W-League (1995–2015) teams
United Soccer League teams based in Canada
USL W-League (1995–2015) teams
2004 establishments in Ontario
2007 disestablishments in Ontario
Association football clubs established in 2004
Association football clubs disestablished in 2007